Jackson Tanner Stephens (born May 11, 1994) is an American professional baseball pitcher in the Atlanta Braves organization. was drafted by the Cincinnati Reds in the 18th round of the 2012 Major League Baseball Draft.  He has previously played in MLB for the Reds and Atlanta Braves.

Career

Cincinnati Reds

Stephens attended Oxford High School in Oxford, Alabama and was drafted by the Cincinnati Reds in the 18th round of the 2012 Major League Baseball Draft. He signed with the Reds, forgoing his commitment to play college baseball at the University of Alabama, and made his professional debut that same season with the Arizona League Reds, going 1-1 with a 4.64 ERA in twenty relief appearances. In 2013, he played for the Dayton Dragons where he pitched to a 3-7 record and 4.59 ERA in 14 games (six starts) and in 2014, he returned to Daytona, going 2-7 with a 4.81 ERA in 14 games started. Stephens spent 2015 with the Daytona Tortugas where he compiled a 12-7 record and a career best 2.97 ERA in 26 starts, and he spent 2016 with the Pensacola Blue Wahoos where he went 8-11 with a 3.33 ERA in 27 games (26 starts).

The Reds added him to their 40-man roster after the 2016 season. He began 2017 with the Louisville Bats.

Stephens was initially called up by the Reds at the end of May 2017 as an emergency relief pitcher but did not make an appearance. The Reds then recalled Stephens once again on July 1 to make his major league debut against the Chicago Cubs. Stephens pitched 5.0 innings in his debut, striking out 8. He also had a two RBI single in the 4th to tie the game for the Reds. He was optioned back to Louisville the day after, and was recalled once again in September. In 26 games for Louisville he was 7-10 with a 4.92 ERA, and in seven games for the Reds he compiled a 2-1 record and 4.68 ERA.

Stephens began 2018 in Cincinnati's bullpen. In 29 games, he pitched in  innings, holding an ERA of 4.93 with 33 strikeouts. Stephens was outrighted off the Reds roster following the 2019 season. He became a free agent following the 2019 season.

Tecolotes de los Dos Laredos
On June 4, 2021, Stephens signed with the Tecolotes de los Dos Laredos of the Mexican League.

Atlanta Braves
On January 12, 2022, Stephens signed a minor league contract with the Atlanta Braves organization. On April 12, Stephens' contract was selected by the Braves. He pitched the final three innings of a 16–4 victory against the Washington Nationals that night in his first career save. While facing the St. Louis Cardinals on August 26, a line drive hit by Brendan Donovan struck Stephens in the head. He was placed on the seven-day injured list with a concussion. Stephens returned to the team on September 4. He finished the regular season with a 3.69 ERA Across 39 appearances, including one start and two saves. Stephens made the Braves’ postseason roster for the national league division series against the Philadelphia Phillies. He appeared in one game in which he pitched two scoreless innings. On November 18, 2022, Stephens was non tendered and became a free agent. On December 26, 2022, the Braves resigned Stephens to a 1-year, $740,000 contract. He was sent outright to Triple-A on March 19, 2023.

References

External links

1994 births
Living people
People from Oxford, Alabama
Baseball players from Alabama
Major League Baseball pitchers
Cincinnati Reds players
Atlanta Braves players
Arizona League Reds players
Dayton Dragons players
Daytona Tortugas players
Pensacola Blue Wahoos players
Louisville Bats players
Tecolotes de los Dos Laredos players
Cardenales de Lara players
American expatriate baseball players in Mexico
American expatriate baseball players in Venezuela